Hypertrichosis cubiti (also known as "hairy elbow syndrome") is a cutaneous condition characterized by multiple terminal hairs on both elbows in children.

Causes 
One known cause of hypertrichosis cubiti is Wiedemann-Steiner syndrome.

Diagnosis

See also 
 Hook nail
 List of cutaneous conditions

References 

Conditions of the skin appendages
Syndromes